Carl-Eduard Otto Wolfgang Jayme Anders, Prince of Bismarck, often known as Calle von Bismarck, is a German politician. A member of the CDU, he was a member of the Bundestag from 2005 to 2007.

Background and education
Born in Zurich, Switzerland, as Count of Bismarck-Schönhausen, Carl is a member of the princely House of Bismarck and the son of the lawyer and landowner Ferdinand von Bismarck and the Belgian countess Elisabeth Lippens. He is the great-great-grandson of the German chancellor Otto von Bismarck.

After receiving his Abitur in 1982, von Bismarck completed his two years of military service at the Bismarck Kasern in Wentorf, West Germany.

In 1985, von Bismarck concluded his training in capital markets investing at Citibank and worked for Shearson Lehman in New York. In 1988 he received his bachelor's degree in international business from UCLA.

Career

Business
In 1989, von Bismarck was requested by his father to return to West Germany. Between 1989 and 1992, he worked for the company Investor Treuhand in Düsseldorf. Since 1993 he worked for the Princely Bismarck Administration (Fürstlich von Bismarck'schen Verwaltung) in Friedrichsruh.

Politics
Bismarck became a member of the CDU in 1995, and was elected vice-chairman of the CDU in Lauenburg in 1999 (his ancestor, Otto von Bismarck, had been the nominal Duke of Lauenburg in the 1890s).  When Peter Harry Carstensen became Prime Minister of Schleswig-Holstein, Bismarck replaced him in the Bundestag, the German parliament. In the 2005 federal election, he won his constituency with a plurality (44.4%) of the vote. Criticism arose, however, because after initial efforts he was only loosely exercising his mandate and rarely appeared in parliament. He resigned his mandate on 19 December 2007. If he had resigned in January, as planned, he would have been eligible for a pension, inciting more criticism.

Personal life
Von Bismarck was previously married to Mexican-American actress Laura Harring (1987–1989), Swiss heiress and humanitarian Celia Demaurex (1997–2004), and Israeli-born Canadian designer Nathalie Bariman (2004–2014). He then married Italo-Brazilian art writer and curator Alessandra Silvestri-Levy in 2016.

Von Bismarck has two children with Nathalie Bariman, i.e. a son and heir apparent to the princely title, Count Alexei von Bismarck-Schönhausen, and a daughter, Countess Grace von Bismarck-Schönhausen. Bariman is Jewish, and they married in a Jewish ceremony. German Chancellor Angela Merkel is reported to have told the couple, "You two have united history … the next Prince of Bismarck will be a mix of both religions."

See also 
 Gottfried von Bismarck (brother)
 Mona von Bismarck
 House of Bismarck

References 

Members of the Bundestag for Schleswig-Holstein
Carl-Eduard
Living people
Members of the Bundestag 2005–2009
Members of the Bundestag 2002–2005
Members of the Bundestag for the Christian Democratic Union of Germany
German people of Belgian descent
German people of Swedish descent
German people of English descent
German people of Hungarian descent
Princes of Bismarck
Year of birth missing (living people)